Forman Park,  in Syracuse, New York, was first established on June 16, 1839 and was known as Forman Square. The main attraction is a bronze memorial of early civic leaders, Joshua Forman and Lewis H. Redfield. 

The park was established by the Forman Park Trustees of the village of Syracuse.

See also 
 Downtown Syracuse

References

External links 
 
 City of Syracuse, Department of Parks - Forman Park

Parks in Syracuse, New York